W15EB-D (channel 21) is a low-power Class A television station in Charlotte, North Carolina, United States. The station is owned by Innovate Corp. The transmitter is located on the Morris Communications Tower in South Charlotte.

History 
The station's construction permit was issued on January 11, 1993 under the calls of W34BN.  It was changed to DW34BN on September 1, 1993 and moved between the two until changing to W21CK-D on April 4, 2008. It changed to the current callsign of W15EB-D on October 8, 2019.

Subchannels
The station's digital signal is multiplexed:

In late 2019, subchannels 21.1 was assigned to Soul of the South and 21.2 was Three Angels Broadcasting Network (3ABN); in 2020, Soul of the South was dropped, moving 3ABN to 21.1 and Cheddar was added on 21.2. In September 2020, its affiliation with 3ABN ended, with the 21.1 changed to Infomercials. In April 2021, ShopHQ was added on 21.1 and BeIN Sports Xtra replaced Cheddar on 21.2.

References

External links

Low-power television stations in the United States
Innovate Corp.
15EB-D
Television channels and stations established in 1993
1993 establishments in North Carolina
Classic Reruns TV affiliates